Jedlnia  is a village in the administrative district of Gmina Pionki, within Radom County, Masovian Voivodeship, in east-central Poland.

The village has a population of 3,000.

References

   History of Jedlnia at the official webpage

Jedlnia